The Fortschritt E 516 is a self-propelled combine harvester made by VEB Mähdrescherwerk Boschofswerda/Singwitz. It was developed in the late 1960s and first half of the 1970s, and after extensive testing in 1975, it was put into series production in 1977. In 1983, the E 516's second generation, the Fortschritt E 516 B was introduced. It was discontinued in 1988 in favour of its successor, the Fortschritt E 517.

Technical description 

The Fortschritt E 516 is a conventional straw-walker combine harvester, and has front-wheel drive with a continuously variable hydraulic transmission. The corn passes through the E 516 in longitudinal fashion. This means that it enters the combine in front, and gets pulled into the mid-mounted threshing drum; the straw exits the machine in back, after getting cleaned in the straw walkers, which are installed in the E 516's rear compartment. The Fortschritt E 516 can be used for several different types of corn; it can be used on slopes with an angle of up to 9.45°. From the factory, 6.7 m (22 ft) and 7.6 m (25 ft) headers, as well as 6 and 8 row maize-picker huskers were available. The E 516's rated corn performance is 14,000 kg/h.

The threshing drum has a width of 1625 mm and a diameter of 800 mm. It is equipped with 10 rasp bars. It is driven by a belt, that is hydraulically adjustable in length (continuously variable transmission), in order to adjust the threshing drum speed. The speed is adjustable between 530 and 955 min−1. The concave has an angle of 120°, 16 rasp bars, and an area of 1.43 m2. Its distance from the threshing drum can be quickly adjusted in three steps using a lever in the driver's cabin; fine adjusting is possible with a knob next to the lever. The E 516 has five straw walkers with seven steps each; the total straw walker aera is 7.68 m2.

The E 516 is powered by an IFA 8 VD 14,5/12,5-1 SVW four-stroke diesel engine. This engine is a naturally aspirated, water-cooled pushrod V8, with two camshafts, and four crossflow cylinder heads. It has a helix-controlled inline injection pump, and direct injection with hyperboloid-like shaped combustion chambers. With a cylinder bore of 125 mm and a stroke of 145 mm, it displaces 14.23 dm3. The prototype versions were rated 162 kW at 2200 min−1; the E 516's series production version had an output of 168 kW at 2200 min−1 and produced a maximum torque of 961 N·m at 1400 min−1. The E 516 B's 8 VD 14,5/12,5-1 SVW engine had a reduced speed of 2000 min−1, but was still rated 168 kW.

Fortschritt E 516 B 

A series of tests, conducted during the 1980 corn harvesting season with several E 516 combines, equipped with Rába-made MAN D 2156 MT 6 and 8 VD 14,5/12,5-1 SVW engines, showed that reducing the 8 VD 14,5/12,5-1 SVW's engine speed by 200 min−1 would result in a reduction in fuel consumption of up to 15 %. The updated 8 VD 14,5/12,5-1 SVW engine was installed in the E 516's second generation, the E 516 B. According to the manufacturer, the series production E 516 B has 10 % less fuel consumption whilst retaining the full engine power, compared to the first generation E 516. In addition to the updated engine, the E 516 B received new portal axles, new tyres, an improved cabine ventilation system, and an engine start protection system to prevent engine starting without the drive lever being in the neutral position.

References

External links 

Combine harvesters
IFA vehicles